Bhadani is a village in Jhajjar Tehsil in Jhajjar district of Haryana State, India. It belongs to Rohtak Division. Bhadani and Khera (Bhadana) are two villages adjacent to each other and Kheri Asra, Surkhpur, Jhajjar, Shekhupur and Kablana, Chudani are nearby villages. It is located 10 km towards East from District headquarters Jhajjar. 10 km from Jhajjar. 269 km from State capital Chandigarh. Its Pin code is 124104 and postal head office is Nehru College Jhajjar.

History of Bhadani

Antiquity. The history of Bhadani, a large village in Jhajjar district of Haryana dates back to 1545 -75, when two separate settlements named Rai Bhadani  of  Phalaswals and Chhoti Bhadani of Sehrawats came up. Two generations latter, that is, in 1620 -30, Bhadani Usman was settled by Deswals. In 1877  the village was inhabited by the twelfth generation  since its establishment. Considering the fact that life-span of one generation is taken as 30 years   the village would have been established in second half of Sixteenth century between 1545 –1575. These facts are recorded in the Shajra – Malikan  Mouza Bhadani, Tehsil Jhajjar, District Rohtak written on 19 April 1877.

Some Brahmin families who live in Bhadani are descendants of Kanwa dynasty that ruled Magadh empire from 76 BC to 26 BC. Prominent personalities of Kanwa family in Bhadani include Pandit Singh Ram Pehalwan and Captain (Retd.) Rohtash Singh Kanwa.

Name of the Village. There is no authentic record as to why name Bhadani was chosen.

Ruling Deity. Ruling deity of Bhadani is Shiva in form of Ardhnariswar.

Sequence of settlement of the village.  The village was settled in three sequential waves. Before we attempt to establish the sequence of settlement, it is important to understand meaning of words Rai and Usman. 
•	Rai. In the Hindu lexicon Rai stands for a sovereign king.  During pre-Sultanate period, Rai  was placed higher than Raja. However, during the Mughal period, Rai stood for administrator of Imperial land (Khalisa).  
•	Usman. In Islamic lexicon Usman was the third Caliph. However, in so far as we are concerned, it is more pertinent to note that during early seventeenth century Usman was a name widely used by Afghans and during the period 1620 – 1718 Kalals, of Afghan origin, were Shiqdars of Jhajjar.

Since we know that entire area of present-day Haryana was Khalisa (Imperial Land) during the Mughal period, it would be reasonable to conclude that Rai Bhadani came up when the then Rai (Administrator of Khalisa) allotted Khalisa land to farmers of Phalaswal Gotra. Chhoti Bhadani as the name suggests came up next to extant Badi (elder) Bhadani, that is, Rai Bhadani.

We also know from Shajra Malikan -e - Maouza, that, the Deswals came two generations after the Phalaswals and Sehrawats and till 1877 their nine generations had lived in the village. And, one generation period is taken as 30 years. Hence Deswals would have come around 1620 - 1630. This was the period when the Afghans of Kalal Clkan were the Shiqdars of Jhajjar, and Usman is a popular name among Afghans. Hence it is quite likely that one of the Shiqdars named Usman allotted Khalisa land to Deswals sometime in 1620 – 1630 and named their settlement Bhadani Usman.

Consolidation of the village. The period of 1712 – 1803 was marked by the Great Anarchy which engulfed the nation following demise of Mughal Empire. By 1750 the conditions had become so dangerous and unbearable that many families migrated to safer areas and those who stayed behind left their respective smaller Bhadanis and consolidated at the present location. Apparently this process of re-location would have taken place over a period of  time, hence it is not possible to fix a date for establishment of larger Bhadani. However it is likely to have taken place sometime between 1740 – 1775.  Original Khedas were located as follows:
(a)	Phalaswal. Present location of Bhadana.
(b)	Sehrawat: Somewhere towards Jhajjar on periphery of Bir Sunarwala. 
(c)	Deswal: Somewhere towards Kablana.

History of Pannas. Bhadani village has three main Pannas of Jats, namely Sehrawat, Phalaswal and Deswal and some families of Rahar besides usual mix of Brahman, Bania, Sunar, Khati, Lohar, Kumhar, Chamar and Chura families living in harmony.

•	Phalaswal. Sometime in 1545 – 1575 a family of Phalaswals headed by Makhha migrated from unknown place to establish Rai Bhadani. He had three sons named Puran, Issar and Kanhiya (Nanha). To commemorate the memory of Makhha, the Phalaswal Panna was also known as Makhha Panna. In the year 1754 Hemkaran of Puran branch and Raja Ram of Issar branch migrated from Bhadani. Raja Ram shifted to Pahari Dheeraj and his family has stayed there ever since. Their land was tilled by Nanha  branch for next three generations. However, in the year 1807, the Nawab allotted around 1120 Bighas of Phalaswal estate to some Brahmin families whom he had brought from Patli village, District Gurgaon and settled them in a newly created village named Bhadana on the Kheda of Phalaswals. Hence when in 1810 – 12 the third generation of Hemkaran returned to reclaim their lands they found that their own share had already been given away by the Nawab to Brahmins of Bhadana. With mutual agreement the balance land was redistributed into four equal parts between Lasvid and  Arjan of Puran (Hemkaran) branch and Sewga and Laxman from Kanhiya branch. Their successors are living here ever since.

•	Sahrawats. The Saharawat family had migrated from Mahrauli Village of Delhi district to establish Chhoti Bhadani almost simultaneously with the Phalaswals. During the period of Great Anarchy many Sharawat families migrated to other places. Family of Munia went to Bhorgarh, District Delhi.  Kishan Lal son of Ram Dayal came back from  Bhorgarh on 21 December 1867 to reclaim his property.  Moti, went away but came back in his own life time.  Sukha from Heera Thola went away to Daryapur in Delhi and his successor Hansram came back in the year 1867 to reclaim his property. Another family had shifted to Jharoda and came back once the British rule was established. In the year 1877, Saharawats had three tholas, namely Deepraj, Jadon and Heera and their successors have been living here ever since.

•	Deswal.  The Deswal family had come here from village Aldyoka, District  Gurugram  and their nine generations had lived in Bhadani till 1877.  Many of their families migrated from here to safer places during the Great Anarchy but most of these families returned when the law and order was re-established by the British. Their successors have been living here ever since.  Deswal Pana was also known as Sarguroh  pana. Surguroh in Persian means of one family.

Revenue during pre – 1947 period. The revenue was charged as follows:
•	Nawab. The village was purchased by one Imam Khan, Tehsildar of Jhajjar on Istamrari. He used to collect one quarter of the crop as revenue on behalf of Nawab and take another 10 percent for himself as collection charge. In addition the farmer had to contribute his proportionate share in the five rupee paid collectively to the Numberdar as Pichotra and towards the pay of Patwari. Thus effective revenue taken from a farmer was 40 percent of the produce.
•	British. The British introduced system of direct revenue collection, wherein one quarter of the produce was taken either in cash or kind. All other taxes were removed and the Numberdars and Patwaris became government employees. Thus effective  revenue taken from the farmer during the British period  reduced by nearly half as compared to the Nawab's rule.

References

Villages in Jhajjar district